Beverly Rose Potts (April 15, 1941 – disappeared August 24, 1951) an ten-year-old American girl who disappeared while walking home from a neighborhood festival event held in a park less than a quarter of a mile from her Cleveland, Ohio home. Despite intense publicity and repeated, exhaustive efforts to locate the child both at the time of her disappearance and in more recent decades, no trace of Potts or definitive leads as to the circumstances surrounding her disappearance have ever materialized. Foul play is strongly suspected.

The disappearance of Beverly Potts implemented the largest manhunt to locate a missing person in the history of Cleveland at the time. The case itself is regarded as one of the most infamous missing persons and cold cases in Ohio and has been described by one author as "one of the most haunting and heartbreaking mysteries" in the history of Cleveland.

Background
Beverly Potts was the younger of two daughters born to Robert and Elizabeth ( Treuer) Potts. The family resided at 11304 Linnet Avenue in Cleveland, Ohio.

Potts was a quiet, responsible and obedient child who was close to her parents and only sister, 22-year-old Anita. She was tall for her age. According to some accounts, by 1951, she appeared one or two years older than her ten years. She attended Louis Agassiz Elementary School, where she was regarded as an attentive and popular student. Although generally shy, but friendly, Potts was described by many who knew her as markedly timid and taciturn when in the company of individuals she did not know—particularly adolescent or adult males outside of her immediate family. This wariness extended to male family members of her close friends.

The Potts' always insisted their younger daughter always observed a strict curfew, with the child being grounded if she did not return home by the time agreed with her parents. On one day in mid-August, Potts arrived home later than agreed. In response, her mother forbade her daughter from attending an upcoming annual performing show to be held at nearby Halloran Park on August 24. However, as one of her daughter's greatest interests was the performing arts and Potts had been thrilled at the prospect of viewing the performance, her mother agreed to let her attend this performance event on the afternoon in question in return for a promise she would immediately return home.

August 24, 1951
On the afternoon of August 24, Potts attended the annual summer city-sponsored children's performance event in West Cleveland's Halloran Park, less than a quarter of a mile from the Potts household and an estimated three-minute walk from her home. The performance in question that date was the Showagon; an annual jamboree-like event predominantly showcasing the talents of local youngsters. She attended this event in the company of her friend and neighbor Patricia Swing.

Attending Halloran Park unsupervised in the late afternoon was a rare instance for neighborhood children, as the park was generally considered unsafe for children after dark, when large trees dimmed the surrounding streetlights and visibility was thus limited. The park was also frequented by the local vagrant population.

The two girls initially opted to ride to the park on their bicycles at around 7 p.m. At 8 p.m., deciding it would be easier to maneuver on foot through the large crowds in attendance, the two returned home to drop off their bikes, arriving back at the park sometime before 8:30 p.m.

At approximately 8:45 p.m., Swing, who had promised her parents to be home before dark, suggested the two leave for home; Potts refused, saying that she had been given permission to stay for the entire show, which was not due to end until after 9 p.m., so Swing went back to her own house alone. Swing last saw Potts in the crowd, avidly watching the performances onstage.

Disappearance
By 9:30 p.m., the show had ended and the park was emptying. At this time, a 13-year-old boy who knew Potts well saw her heading diagonally across the park in a northeasterly direction, about 150 yards from the corner of Linnet Avenue and West 117th Street. (This would have been the quickest route for Potts' to take to her home, which would then only be two or three minutes' walk away.) The boy recognized Potts by her distinctive "duck-like" gait, walking with toes pointed outward. Several other witnesses informed investigators they had seen a girl resembling Potts walking near a stationary, battered and crudely painted black 1937 or '38 Dodge coupe with a "smoking, noisy muffler" on West 117th Street, apparently speaking to two young men inside. These various eyewitnesses placed this encounter anywhere between 8:30 and 9:30 p.m., although none of these individuals had seen the girl entering the car.

One of the final potential sightings of Potts occurred at approximately 9:45 p.m. close to the intersection of West 110th Street and Baltic Avenue. This sighting was reported by an unidentified woman who informed investigators she had observed a dark colored 1948 coupe speeding north on Baltic Avenue with an obviously distressed child upon the back seat with her hands bound behind her back, thrashing and repeatedly shouting "I want to get out!"

Missing person report
When Potts had not returned home by 10 p.m., her family phoned the Swing residence, only to be informed their daughter had returned home alone almost an hour previous and that Potts had remained alone at the park. Her parents immediately began to search the area; their search began by retracing the environs of the route Beverly had taken to Halloran Park, then a search of the park itself; their search then expanded to encompass nearby streets and locations the child may have been. The Potts then visited the homes of their daughter's other close friends, only to learn their child was not at any of these residences. Approximately one hour later, having found no sign of their daughter and sister, the distraught family contacted the police to report Beverly missing.

Investigation
Police immediately launched an intense effort to locate Potts; their efforts began by searching the local vicinity and questioning friends, acquaintances, and individuals known to have been at Halloran Park. By daylight on August 25, a large-scale, statewide manhunt to locate the child was implemented. Detective Chief James McArthur assigned 45 officers full-time to search for the child. Their physical searches were bolstered by numerous auxiliary police and civilian volunteers.

With assistance from volunteers, police implemented a large-scale search of their own but were unable to find any trace of Potts, even after several days' investigation including door-to-door canvassing of nearby neighborhoods, tracing suspicious cars, searching nearby vacant lots, and using a plane to survey open railway cars. All these avenues of investigation failed to yield results.

Media interest in the child's disappearance was intense. All three statewide television stations broadcast images of Potts, a  description of her clothing and the circumstances surrounding her disappearance accompanied by appeals for information. In additon, a $1,500 reward was offered by Potts' father's labor union, AFL-Stagehands, for any information successfully leading to the whereabouts of his daughter. As a result of these appeals, investigators assigned to the case received and pursued thousands of telephone tips; however, none provided any solid leads. All known sex offenders were questioned with regards to their whereabouts on the date of Potts' disappearance; all were eliminated from the inquiry. Potts' family members were also cleared; investigators determined that her home life had been stable and by all accounts happy, and there appeared to be no reason for her to have run away. Furthermore, investigators learned from Potts' mother that on August 24, her daughter was eagerly anticipating a family trip to Euclid Beach Park, which the family had been scheduled to embark upon the morning after her disappearance.

Potts was known to be markedly shy, especially around men, and particularly cautious of strangers. Investigators theorized that she had most likely been enticed into a nearby house or car on her way home by someone she knew, perhaps with the promise of a babysitting job (despite her youth, Potts was regularly hired as a sitter for neighborhood children) or a request to run an errand. It was thought that Potts might have been killed by a neighbor and buried in or around one of the nearby houses on Linnet Avenue, and at least one search to that effect was conducted in 1973, in the basement of what by then was an auto body shop. However, no signs of Potts were found there or elsewhere, and no plausible local suspect has ever been uncovered.

As a suspicious, "battered" old vehicle had been seen in the vicinity of Potts' abduction and witnesses reported the child had been seen talking with "two strangers in an old Dodge with recently repaired fenders" shortly before she vanished, one theory investigators pursued was the likelihood the child had been kidnapped by a sex offender or offenders—possibly with a predilection for children.

Family statement
One week after the disappearance of their daughter and sister, the Potts family issued a public appeal to her abductor(s), stating they accepted the likelihood Beverly was no longer alive and pleading for the return of her body in order that the child could receive a decent Christian burial, stating: "We have finally come to the realization we will never see our Beverly alive again. We urge whoever did this terrible thing to write or telephone to us, or the police, the location of Beverly's body so that we can reclaim [her] and give her a decent Christian burial." Her abductor(s) failed to respond to this appeal.

Later developments
In 1980, two retired Cleveland police detectives, James Fuerst and Robert Shankland, revealed that in 1974 they had received a tip from a local attorney with a client whose brother had supposedly confessed to abducting Potts. The detectives subsequently found and questioned the brother, who, they said, had readily admitted to having lived near Halloran Park in 1951 and making a habit of picking up and molesting young girls there. The man did not remember abducting Potts in particular, but said he had "flashes" of memory involving a girl named Beverly. Fuerst and Shankland were convinced the man was guilty, but the county prosecutors' office refused to pursue the case, citing a lack of evidence.

In 1994, a letter was discovered under a carpet in a Cleveland house, written by a woman who claimed to have caught her husband disposing of Potts' body in their furnace. Upon her being traced and questioned by police, the woman said that the allegation was false; she had written the letter solely as a revenge fantasy against her abusive husband.

More letters were sent to reporter Brent Larkin of the Cleveland Plain Dealer beginning in 2000, purporting to be from an elderly and infirm man who claimed that he wanted to confess to molesting and murdering Potts before his imminent death. The anonymous author pledged to turn himself in on August 24, 2001, the fiftieth anniversary of Potts' disappearance, but shortly beforehand wrote again to say he had to enter a nursing home and would be unable to honor his promise or otherwise reveal himself. An extensive investigation failed to turn up any clues to the author's identity; Larkin now believes the letters to have been a distasteful hoax.

Suspects
Several suspects have emerged over the years, although none can be definitively linked to Potts' abduction:

Harvey Rush
In 1955, Harvey Lee Rush, a drifter and Cleveland native, told police in California that he had killed Potts after luring her to a nearby bridge with candy; however, he placed the murder in 1952, a year after Potts' actual disappearance. Rush recanted his entire story shortly after being extradited to Cleveland, saying that he had confessed merely as a way to get back to his hometown.

William Redmond
William Henry Redmond, an Ohio native and former carnival worker with a record of child molestation convictions pertaining to young girls dating back to 1935, was indicted in 1988 for the April 25, 1951 Pennsylvania murder of eight-year-old Jane Marie Althoff. While incarcerated, Redmond reportedly confessed to a cellmate that he had also killed three other young girls. When questioned about the Potts case in particular, Redmond refused to make a statement one way or the other. He is known to have been in the general area of Potts' disappearance on the date in question; however, Potts would have been considerably older than his previous victims.

Aftermath
The enduring mystery of Potts' disappearance, the exhaustive—yet ultimately unsuccessful—nationwide investigation as to her whereabouts and the actual motive behind her abduction has captured the imagination of the press and public alike in and around Cleveland for decades. According to some accounts, Potts' disappearance increased parents' wariness as to their own children's safety and many children raised in and around the city were heavily chaperoned for many years following the incident. The case remains one of Cleveland's most infamous missing persons cases.

Potts' mother, Elizabeth, died at age 56 in March 1956—her demise reportedly hastened by grief sourcing from her daughter's disappearance. Her father, Robert, died in February 1970. Both are interred in West Park Cemetery in Cuyahoga County, Ohio. A memorial marker to Beverly is situated directly next to the graves of her parents. This marker is inscribed with the words: "In Memory of Beverly Rose Potts."

Potts's own sister, Anita, continued to search for her only sister until her own death in 2006. She seldom discussed her sister's disappearance in much detail prior to her death. However, the effect of her sister's abduction greatly impacted her own parenting. According to her daughter, Megan Roberts (b. 1964), the event "absolutely affected her parenting. She was strict, and always wanted to know where we were, who we were with ... but she very seldom spoke of Beverly other than to tell us she had a sister that disappeared. She would say it was just too painful to talk about ... it was very emotional for her."

Media

Bibliography

Television
 The 2004 documentary Dusk & Shadow: The Mystery of Beverly Potts draws direct inspiration from Potts' disappearance. Directed by Mark Wade Stone, this 53-minute documentary was first broadcast on December 14, 2004. Potts' sister, Anita, is among those interviewed by the director.

See also

 Cold case
 List of people who disappeared
 National Center for Missing and Exploited Children
 The Doe Network

Notes

References

Further reading

External links

 Contemporary news article pertaining to the disappearance of Beverly Potts
 2015 news article focusing upon the 50th anniversary of Potts' disappearance
 
 charleyproject.org webpage pertaining to Beverly Potts
 
 

1941 births
1950s in Cleveland
1950s missing person cases
1951 crimes in the United States
1951 in Ohio
August 1951 events in the United States
Child safety
Crime in Ohio
History of Cleveland
Kidnapped American children
Kidnappings in the United States
Missing American children
Missing person cases in Ohio
People from Cleveland
Possibly living people